Sanjao sam san... is the ninth studio album of Montenegrin singer Šako Polumenta, which was released in July 2008. This album was recorded in Studio Ceca in Belgrade, the first before the studio's official opening on June 14 to coincide with its owner, Ceca Raznatovic's, birthday. Sako Polumenta invested more money into this project than in any other album he recorded.

Featured in this album was Sako's nephew, Dado Polumenta, who, with Sako, recorded the album's greatest hit, Ljepsa od noci.

Songs 

The album contains twelve songs and two previously unreleased bonus songs. The track listings are as follows:

2008 albums
Šako Polumenta albums